The Unterrothorn (or simply Rothorn) is a mountain of the Swiss Pennine Alps, overlooking Zermatt in the canton of Valais. It is located west of the Oberrothorn, on the range north of the Findel Glacier.

The summit can be reached by cable car via Sunnegga and Blauherd. The Rothorn paradise is one of the main ski areas located around Zermatt.

See also
List of mountains of Switzerland accessible by public transport

References

External links
Unterrothorn on Hikr

Mountains of the Alps
Alpine three-thousanders
Mountains of Valais
Cable cars in Switzerland
Mountains of Switzerland